Tunan Marca District is one of thirty-four districts of the province Jauja in Peru.

See also 
 Tunanmarka

References